Rhian Davies (born 5 January 1981 in Wales) is an Australian soccer player, who currently plays for Canberra United FC in the Australian W-League.

National duties
She has represented Australia at the 2003 FIFA Women's World Cup, 2004 Olympics and the 2006 AFC Women's Asian Cup.

International goals

Fly in, fly out
Davies works in the remote community of Yirrkala, Northern Territory and travels over 3,000 km each way to Canberra for every game.

References

External links
 FIFA Player Profile
 Canberra United FC profile

1981 births
Living people
Australian women's soccer players
Canberra United FC players
Olympic soccer players of Australia
Footballers at the 2004 Summer Olympics
2003 FIFA Women's World Cup players
2007 FIFA Women's World Cup players
Australia women's international soccer players
Footballers from Bridgend
Women's association football defenders